The 1935 Princeton Tigers football team was an American football team that represented Princeton University as an independent during the 1935 college football season. In its fourth season under head coach Fritz Crisler, the team compiled a 9–0 record and outscored opponents by a total of 256 to 32. The team played its home games at Palmer Stadium in Princeton, New Jersey.

The team was retroactively recognized as the 1935 national champion under the Dunkel System.

Pepper Constable was the team captain. Garry Le Van received the John Prentiss Poe Cup, the team's highest award. Guard Jac Weller was a consensus first-team pick on the 1935 All-America college football team. Six Princeton players were selected by the Associated Press to the 1935 All-Eastern football team: Jac Weller at guard (AP-1); Stephen Cullinan at center (AP-1); Ken Sandbach at quarterback (AP-1); Gilbert Lea at end (AP-2); Charles Toll at tackle (AP-2); and Jack H. White at halfback (AP-2).

Schedule

References

Princeton
Princeton Tigers football seasons
College football national champions
College football undefeated seasons
Princeton Tigers football